The 2015–16 McNeese State Cowgirls basketball team represented McNeese State University during the 2015–16 NCAA Division I women's basketball season. The Cowgirls, led by ninth year head coach Brooks Donald-Williams, played all their home games at Burton Coliseum. They were members of the Southland Conference. They finished the season 20–13, 11–7 in Southland play to finish in fifth place. They advanced to the semifinals of the Southland women's tournament where they lost to Central Arkansas. They were invited to the Women's Basketball Invitational where they lost to Stetson in the first round.

On April 7, it was announced that Brooks Donald-Williams has resign from her position from McNeese State and accept her assisting coaching position at Alabama. She finished at McNeese State with a 9 year record of 161–130.

Roster

Schedule
Source

|-
!colspan=9 style="background:#0000FF; color:#FFD700;"| Exhibition

|-
!colspan=9 style="background:#0000FF; color:#FFD700;"| Non-conference regular schedule

|-
!colspan=9 style="background:#0000FF; color:#FFD700;"| Southland Conference regular season

|-
!colspan=9 style="background:#0000FF; color:#FFD700;"| Southland Women's Tournament

|-
!colspan=9 style="background:#0000FF; color:#FFD700;"| WBI

See also
2015–16 McNeese State Cowboys basketball team

References

McNeese Cowgirls basketball seasons
McNeese State
McNeese State
McNeese State